Pu Tze-chun is a scholar of Public Management and a former admiral of the Republic of China Navy (ROCN) in Taiwan. He was graduated from I-Shou University, receiving a PhD in Public Management studies. He is the 11th Vice Minister of National Defense, taking office on May 2017. He stepped down in February 2018.

Education
Pu graduated from Republic of China Naval Academy in 1978 and Naval War College in the United States in 1997.

Republic of China Armed Forces
Speaking at Legislative Yuan as the Vice Chief of the General Staff (Executive) of the Republic of China Armed Forces in October 2015 regarding South China Sea territorial disputes, Pu said that the armed forces would defend the nation and also appeal to the international community.

References

1956 births
Living people
Republic of China Navy admirals